Kemal Atatürk High School is a high school in Kadıköy, Istanbul, Turkey.

Established as the Lycée Sainte-Euphémie in 1895, the high school was re-established in 1935 by Mustafa Kemal Atatürk 's order, and after renamed in his memory.

Pupils are nicknamed, for boys "Collégien" and the girls "Collégienne".

High schools in Istanbul
Educational institutions established in 1895
1895 establishments in the Ottoman Empire
Educational institutions established in 1935
1935 establishments in Turkey
Kadıköy
Things named after Mustafa Kemal Atatürk